Meropidia neurostigma is a species of hoverfly in the family Syrphidae.

Distribution
Colombia.

References

Eristalinae
Insects described in 1983
Diptera of South America